The Cyclopteridae are a family of marine fishes, commonly known as lumpsuckers or lumpfish, in the order Scorpaeniformes. They are found in the cold waters of the Arctic, North Atlantic, and North Pacific oceans. The greatest number of species are found in the North Pacific. The family name Cyclopteridae derives from the Greek words κύκλος (kyklos), meaning "circle", and πτέρυξ (pteryx), meaning "wing" or "fin", in reference to the circle-shaped pectoral fins of most of the fish in this family.

Genera
Cyclopteridae includes the following valid genera:

Description 

Lumpsuckers are named appropriately enough; their portly bodies are nearly spherical with generally drab coloration and lithic patterns. The "sucker" part refers to the fish's modified pelvic fins, which have evolved into adhesive discs (located ventrally, behind the pectoral fins); the fish use these discs to adhere to the substrate. Many species have bony, wart-like tubercles adorning the head and body; these are important taxonomic features of the family.

The simple, rounded fins are small with the exception of the broad, fan-like pectorals, which actually extend ventrally. The first of the two dorsal fins is spinous, with 4-8 spines; in some species, this fin is completely overgrown with skin and therefore not visible. While the lateral line in lumpsuckers is otherwise reduced or absent, it is well developed in the head; some species even have tubular, whisker-like external projections of the opercular canal, which is a part of the cranial lateral line system.

The relatively small mouths of lumpsuckers are lined with narrow rows of small conical teeth. The gas bladder is absent.

Habitat and diet 
As their appearance might suggest, lumpsuckers are poor swimmers. Most species are benthic; that is, they spend most of their time on or near the bottom. The fish are found on rocky or muddy substrates, where their colouration allows for effective camouflage. Some of the deeper-living species are however pelagic, remaining some distance above the ocean floor.

Benthic species feed on sessile invertebrates such as polychaete worms, crustaceans and mollusks. Pelagic species target prey they are capable of overtaking, namely slow-moving jellyfish and ctenophores.

Before their yolk is completely absorbed, juvenile lumpsuckers consume the larvae of crustaceans, which grow on seaweed near the surface, and smaller halacrid mites. Juveniles consume larger harpacticoids and isopods after they have absorbed their yolk.

Behaviour and reproduction 
Lumpsuckers are a poorly studied group, with little known of their behaviour and biology. At least some species are known to travel great distances in order to spawn in shallow, intertidal waters (from December to June in the smooth lumpsucker); this may well be true of all species. Males are also known to guard the brood of spherical eggs.

One of the peculiarities of Lumpsuckers' neural system is that they lack Mauthner cell neurons in their hindbrain, while these cells are present in virtually all other teleost fish. Nevertheless, the lumpsuckers do have a C-startle response, which is apparently mediated by other hindbrain cells.

Hatchlings have well-developed pectoral fins and adhesive pelvic discs, which the fish use to cling to rocks in shallow water. Young fish remain in shallow, warmer water until fully developed. Pacific cod and sablefish are known predators of lumpsuckers.

Fishers and the lumpsucker industry
The only species that is targeted commercially is Cyclopterus lumpus, which is targeted primarily for its roe in Canada, Greenland, Iceland, and Norway, and to a lesser extent in Denmark and Sweden. Cyclopterus lumpus are also caught from the wild to provide broodstock for the aquaculture industry where the fish is used as a cleaner fish to remove sea lice in salmon aquaculture.

Species

There are about 30 species in eight genera:
 Genus Aptocyclus De la Pylaie, 1835
 Aptocyclus ventricosus (Pallas, 1769) (Smooth lumpsucker)
 Genus Cyclopsis Popov, 1930
 Cyclopsis tentacularis Popov, 1930
 Genus Cyclopteropsis Soldatov & Popov, 1929
 Cyclopteropsis bergi Popov, 1929
 Cyclopteropsis brashnikowi (P. Y. Schmidt, 1904)
 Cyclopteropsis inarmatus Mednikov (ru) & Prokhorov, 1956 (Bumpy lumpsucker)
 Cyclopteropsis jordani Soldatov, 1929 (Smooth lumpfish)
 Cyclopteropsis lindbergi Soldatov, 1930
 Cyclopteropsis mcalpini (Fowler, 1914) (Arctic lumpsucker)
 Cyclopteropsis popovi Soldatov, 1929
 Genus Cyclopterus Linnaeus, 1758
 Cyclopterus lumpus Linnaeus, 1758 (Lumpsucker)
 Genus Eumicrotremus T. N. Gill, 1862
 Eumicrotremus andriashevi Perminov, 1936
 E. a. aculeatus Voskoboinikova & Nazarkin, 2015 (Andriashev's spicular-spiny pimpled lumpsucker) 
 E. a. andriashevi Perminov, 1936 (Andriashev's spiny pimpled lumpsucker)
 Eumicrotremus asperrimus (S. Tanaka (I), 1912)
Eumicrotremus awae D. S. Jordan & Snyder, 1902
 Eumicrotremus derjugini Popov, 1926 (Leather-fin lumpsucker)
 Eumicrotremus eggvinii Koefoed, 1956
 Eumicrotremus gyrinops (Garman, 1892)
Eumicrotremus jindoensis  S. J. Lee, J.-K. Kim, Y. Kai, S. Ikeguchi, & T. Nakabo, 2017
 Eumicrotremus orbis (Günther, 1861) (Pacific spiny lumpsucker)
 Eumicrotremus pacificus P. Y. Schmidt, 1904
 Eumicrotremus phrynoides C. H. Gilbert & Burke, 1912 (Toad lumpsucker)
 Eumicrotremus schmidti Lindberg & Legeza, 1955
 Eumicrotremus spinosus (J. C. Fabricius, 1776) (Atlantic spiny lumpsucker)
 Eumicrotremus taranetzi Perminov, 1936
 Eumicrotremus tartaricus Lindberg & Legeza, 1955
 Eumicrotremus terraenovae G. S. Myers & J. E. Böhlke, 1950
Eumicrotremus uenoi  S. J. Lee, J.-K. Kim, Y. Kai, S. Ikeguchi, & T. Nakabo, 2017
 Genus Georgimarinus Voskoboinikova & Nazarkin, 2015 
 Georgimarinus barbatus (Lindberg & Legeza, 1955)
 Genus Lethotremus C. H. Gilbert, 1896
 Lethotremus muticus C. H. Gilbert, 1896
 Genus Microancathus Voskoboinikova, 2015 
 Microancathus fedorovi (Mandritsa, 1991) (Fedorov's lumpsucker)
 Microancathus tokranovi Voskoboinikova, 2015 (Tokranov's lumpsucker) 
Genus Proeumicrotremus Voskoboinikova & Orlov, 2020
 Proeumicrotremus soldatovi (Popov, 1930)

References

Cyclopteridae

Cyclopteroidea
Articles containing video clips
Taxa named by Charles Lucien Bonaparte